Citizens Union is a New York City-based good government group founded in 1897 to combat the influences of the Tammany Hall political machine. J. Pierpont Morgan, Benjamin Altman, Elihu Root, and Carl Schurz numbered among its 165 founders. In 1987, on the 90th anniversary of the organization's founding, The New York Times called Citizens Union "one of the most venerated 'good government' groups in New York City."

In 1902, Citizens Union supported Columbia University president Seth Low in his successful campaign to become the second mayor of New York. Six years later, in 1908, Citizens Union transitioned from a political party to a nonpartisan government watchdog organization. It has published a voter directory every year since 1910, and in 1948 began publishing reports on city politics and reporting on issues of political transparency. In 1999, Citizens Union Foundation launched the Gotham Gazette, a New York newspaper known for its reporting on city and state government activities.

Its current executive director is former New York City Public Advocate Betsy Gotbaum.

References

External links
 
 Citizens Union Foundation

Organizations established in 1897
1897 establishments in New York City
Organizations based in New York City
History of New York City
Government watchdog groups in the United States